The men's team sprint competition of the cycling events at the 2011 Pan American Games will be held on October 17 at the Pan American Velodrome in Guadalajara. The defending Pan American Games champion is Ahmed López, Julio César Herrera and Yosmani Poll of Cuba.

Schedule
All times are Central Standard Time (UTC-6).

Results
6 teams of three competitors each competed. The top two teams will race for gold, while third and fourth race for the bronze medals.

Qualification

Finals

References

Track cycling at the 2011 Pan American Games
Men's team sprint (track cycling)